Leyland is a town in South Ribble, Lancashire, England, six miles (10 km) south of Preston. The population was 35,578 at the 2011 Census.

The name of the town is Anglo-Saxon, meaning "untilled land".

History

English Leyland was an area of fields, with Roman roads passing through, from ancient Wigan to Walton-le-Dale.

It was left undisturbed for many centuries until rediscovered shortly after the Battle of Hastings (1066). Leyland is mentioned in the Domesday Book (1085). In 1066, King Edward the Confessor presided over the whole of Leyland. The manor was divided into three large ploughlands, which were controlled by local noblemen. In the 12th century, it came under the barony of Penwortham.

The area of Worden, which is now Worden Park, was one of nine oxgangs of land granted to the Knights Hospitaller, by Roger de Lacy, in Lancashire, but the land was not assigned to any individual and a local man, who was a very close friend of de Lacy, Hugh Bussel, was assigned holder of the land in 1212.

Notable features that remain include the St Andrew's Parish Church, built around 1200 AD, and the large stone Leyland Cross, thought to date back to Saxon times.

Industry and commerce
The town is famous primarily for the bus and truck manufacturer Leyland Motors, which between the 1950s and 1970s expanded and grew to own several British motor manufacturers, including British Motor Corporation, Standard-Triumph and Rover, culminating in the massive British Leyland company. The truck business still operates today as Leyland Trucks, and is owned by Paccar.

Leyland is also home to one of the leading maintenance and utility companies in the United Kingdom, Enterprise plc on Centurion Way.

The town has been home to Dr Oetkers pizza factory on Marathon Place, Moss Side, since 1989.

Transport
Leyland railway station is on the West Coast Main Line and is operated by Northern. There is one train an hour between Liverpool Lime Street and Preston. There is also one train an hour between Manchester Victoria/Hazel Grove to Blackpool North.

There is a marker adjacent to the old Leyland Motors Spurrier works at the halfway point on the railway journey between Glasgow and London, some 198 miles in either direction. John Fishwick & Sons which served the town's public transport needs, and connected the town to Chorley and Preston, ceased trading in 2015 and Stagecoach Merseyside & South Lancashire took over the route.

Education

High schools
High schools in Leyland include Balshaw's CE High School near Leyland Cross, St Mary's Catholic High School, Worden Academy, a smaller high school situated to the west of the town and Wellfield Academy near the town centre.

Colleges
To the east of Worden Park is Runshaw College.

Architecture

Since July 2007, the former Primitive Methodist Church on Leyland Lane has been home to the Greek Orthodox Church of the Holy Apostles.

Most of the housing in Leyland falls under the semi-detached, detached and bungalow categories. There are a few modern housing estates, but about 65% of the accommodation in the town was built in the 1970s.

Areas
Leyland is made up by six different areas, the town centre itself counts as the main retail side, with the railway station, library and shops nearby. The other areas include Broadfield, Moss Side, Worden Park, Turpin Green and the Wade Hall estate.

Geography

People

Notable people who have grown up or lived in Leyland include:

 Brian Pilkington, footballer
 Fred Beardsworth, footballer
 William Bennett, 1920s footballer
 Clarke Carlisle, footballer, was educated at Balshaw's CE High School
 Trevor Hemmings, multi millionaire philanthropist spent his teenage years in Leyland
 Allen Hill, played in the first ever cricket Test
 Phil Jones, footballer
 John Lawton, biologist
 Frank Moss, football manager and former player, known for his six-year contract with Arsenal
 Danny Mayor, footballer
 Mike Salmon, retired goalkeeper, who currently works as a football manager
 Kevin Simm, Liberty X singer grew up in the area and attended St Anne's Primary School and St Mary's High School
 Chris Tuson, rugby league player
 John Woodcock, executed by the Stuarts in 1646, for his Catholicism
 Liv Cooke, football freestyler.
 Tim Farron, Leader of the Liberal Democrats 2015–2017, attended Runshaw College as a teenager.

Gallery

See also

Listed buildings in Leyland, Lancashire

References

BBC Online (2006a) Schools in Lancashire, Education\League Tables, 19 January 2006 [accessed 27 June 2007]
BBC Online (2006b) Institutions in Lancashire, Education\League Tables, 19 January 2006 [accessed 4 May 2007]
 Hunt, D., (1990), The History of Leyland and District, Carnegie Press, 
 Hunt, D. and Waring, W. (1995), The Archive Photograph Series: Leyland, Chalford Publishing Company, 
 Smith, J., (2003), Then and Now: Leyland, Tempus Publishing, 
 South Ribble Borough Council – Leyland Town Centre Masterplan [accessed 23 April 2008]

External links

 Leyland Historical Society

 
Towns in Lancashire
Unparished areas in Lancashire
Geography of South Ribble